Hacienda San Francisco, also known as Hacienda Quilichini, is a sugar mill complex with hacienda house that was listed on the U.S. National Register of Historic Places in 1995.  The sugar mill was built in 1871.  The hacienda house and a mill are regarded as contributing buildings;  there are also a kitchen, a shed, a water tower, and some other buildings.

References

National Register of Historic Places in Puerto Rico
Buildings and structures completed in 1871
Grinding mills in Puerto Rico
Grinding mills on the National Register of Historic Places
1871 establishments in Puerto Rico
Sugar plantations in the Caribbean
San Francisco
Sugar industry in Puerto Rico